Admiral Martin may refer to:

United Kingdom
Benjamin Charles Stanley Martin (1891–1957), British Royal Navy vice admiral
George Martin (Royal Navy officer) (1764–1847), British Royal Navy admiral
Henry Byam Martin (1803–1865), British Royal Navy admiral
John Martin (Royal Navy officer) (1918–2011), British Royal Navy vice admiral
Thomas Byam Martin (1773–1854), British Royal Navy admiral
William Martin (Royal Navy officer) (c. 1696–1756), British Royal Navy admiral
Sir William Martin, 4th Baronet (1801–1895), British Royal Navy admiral

United States
Daniel P. Martin (fl. 1990s–2020s), U.S. Navy rear admiral
Edward D. Martin (fl. 1960s–1990s), U.S. Public Health Service Commissioned Corps rear admiral
Edward H. Martin (1931–2014), U.S. Navy vice admiral
Harold M. Martin (1896–1972), U.S. Navy admiral
Kathleen L. Martin (born 1951), U.S. Navy rear admiral

Others
David Martin (governor) (1933–1990), Royal Australian Navy rear admiral
John Martin (admiral) (fl. 1970s–2010s), Royal New Zealand Navy rear admiral
Pierre Martin (French Navy officer) (1752–1820), French Navy vice admiral

See also
Deric Holland-Martin (1906–1977), British Royal Navy admiral